This is a list of seasons completed by the Michigan Wolverines women's basketball team. The program has an all-time record of 691–733, with eleven NCAA tournament appearances and nine Women's National Invitation Tournament (WNIT) appearances. The program's only postseason championship was the 2017 Women's National Invitation Tournament.

Seasons

|-style="background: #ffffdd;"
| colspan="8" align="center" | Big Ten Conference

Notes

References

Michigan
Michigan Wolverines women's basketball seasons
Michigan Wolverines basketball seasons